Habib Jalib Baloch (Urdu: حبیب جالب بلوچ) was a Baloch nationalist politician who had served as a member of the Senate of Pakistan in 1997, and as the secretary general of Balochistan National Party. In his student days he served in a number of leadership positions of the Baloch Students Organization (BSO) as Chairman of BSO and also remained Editor of BSO Organs i.e"Girok","Sangat" and "Bam"(1978–82). 

He was shot dead by unknown persons in Quetta on July 14, 2010. Following his assassination, protests were held in cities across Pakistan while a general strike was held across Balochistan province for three days.

References

External links
 
 
 Gunmen shoot dead former senator in Balochistan, BBC News Online, 14 July 2010
 Baloch leader Habib Jalib assassinated in Quetta, Dawn (newspaper), 15 July 2010
 Balochistan boosts security; Jalib's murder condemned, Dawn (newspaper), 15 July 2010
  Life returns to normalcy in Balochistan, The News International, July 18, 2010
 

Baloch nationalists
Members of the Senate of Pakistan
Baloch people
Baloch Students Organization
2010 deaths
Assassinated Pakistani politicians
People from Quetta
Year of birth missing
Balochistan National Party (Mengal) politicians
People murdered in Balochistan, Pakistan
Deaths by firearm in Balochistan, Pakistan